John J. Spearman (December 17, 1824 - May 31, 1911) was a 19th-century American iron manufacturer, foremost among the iron manufacturers of his era, and for many years identified with the banking interests of Sharon, Pennsylvania.

Early life
He was born in Mc Kee’s Gap, Blair County, Pennsylvania. His parents were Francis and Elizabeth (Ambrose) Spearman. His father was born in Kent county, Maryland, of English origin. His mother was born near McConnellsburg, Pennsylvania. They came to Mercer, Pennsylvania in 1852, where the father died. The mother died at Middlesex and was buried in Mercer. By occupation, the father was a miller. This couple reared a family of eight children, of whom two were sons and six were daughters.

Very early in life Spearman was thrown on his own resources. At the age of fourteen he became a clerk in the mercantile establishment of David Puterbaugh, of Woodbury, Bedford County, Pennsylvania. Here he remained for three years, and then accepted employment in 1841 with Dr. Peter Shoenberger, a prominent manufacturer of iron in those days, at the Rebecca and other furnaces, and Maria forges, in Blair county, Pennsylvania. Here Spearman gained his first practical experience in the manufacture of iron, and he spent six years there.

Education
His early opportunities for education were very limited, and confined to two terms in the early-day common schools. Despite this, by reason of his wide experience of business and by mingling with men of letters and affairs generally, as well as by observation, by reading books and newspapers, he gained an excellent general education.

Iron industry executive
In January, 1847, Spearman took charge of the business management of the Sharon furnace, which was operated at that time by Shoenberger, Agnew & Co. He held this position for a period of six years. In 1853 he purchased the Mazeppa furnace, near Mercer, which he operated until 1859, when he accepted the position of manager of the Sharpsville furnace, where he stayed for three years.

In 1862 he became manager of the iron interests of James Wood & Sons, at Wheatland, and the following year took, an interest as a partner in the business, renamed as James Wood, Sons & Co. This association continued until August, 1870.

Spearman moved to Sharon where, in 1872, he organized the Spearman Iron Company and built the Spearman furnaces at Sharpsville, and became general manager. This was a partnership concern up until 1895, when it was incorporated, and in 1901 the property was sold. Spearman retired from the iron industry, in which he had spent half a century.

In 1868 he was prominent in the organization of the First National Bank of Sharon. The first president was George Prather, who died in the autumn of 1871. He was succeeded by Spearman as president of the bank in January, 1872.

Marriage and family
On March 12, 1851, John Spearman married Cordelia Breed, a daughter of Jabish Breed, of Sharon. Five children were born of this union: Celesta, who married David Adams, Eva, who remained at home, Chloe, wife of W. D. McKeefrey, Francis, who died in 1896, and Benjamin, who resided at Grove City, Pennsylvania. Politically, Mr. Spearman voted the Republican ticket.

Public recognition
Spearman had a long and successful business career and saw many changes in the production of iron. He had a reputation as a reliable man, a good citizen and an exemplar for younger men. In Masonic circles he was an advanced Mason and member of the Knights Templar degree. He was one of the charter members of Sharon Lodge No. 347, Independent Order of Odd Fellows.

He lived to be one of the oldest residents of Mercer County, Pennsylvania, and among the best and most universally known men of the county. He died at his home at Sharon on May 31, 1911.

Sources

 This article incorporates public domain material from 

1824 births
1911 deaths
American steel industry businesspeople
People from Mercer, Pennsylvania
19th-century American businesspeople